U.S. Città di Palermo is playing the season 2007–08 in the Serie A, being the fourth season in a row for Palermo in the league since their return in 2004.

Review and events

Following a hard season ended in fifth place, Francesco Guidolin, sacked and successively recalled during the final days of the 2006–07 season, was not confirmed as Palermo head coach. On 31 May 2007, Atalanta boss Stefano Colantuono was announced to fill the vacant managing position.

Regarding the team players, Giovanni Tedesco announced, immediately following the final 2006–07 matchday, to have agreed for a one-year contract extension. The first two signings for the new season, midfielder Giulio Migliaccio from Atalanta and goalkeeper Samir Ujkani from Anderlecht, were announced on 8 June. On the same day, Palermo captain Eugenio Corini announced his intention not to renew his contract with the rosanero, which due to expire on 30 June, following a dispute with club management. The 22 June deadline for the resolution of co-ownership brought the return of Davide Matteini from Empoli, whereas Stephen Makinwa, previously in co-ownership between Palermo and Lazio, was ultimately acquired by the biancazzurri. That same day, Andrea Caracciolo was announced to have been sold to Sampdoria in a co-ownership bid, whereas Mariano González, back from a season loan to Internazionale, was loaned out once again, this time to Porto. On 28 June, the club unveiled the signing of Serbian international Boško Janković from Mallorca. On 5 July, two moves were made by Palermo, with David Di Michele being sold to Torino and Fabrizio Miccoli signing from Juventus.

Palermo's pre-season phase begun on 12 July, when all the players gathered in Udine and then moved to the training camp of Bad Kleinkirchheim, Austria, where the team stayed until 4 August. From 6 to 12 August, the team successively moved to Villach, and then returned to Palermo in a training session at Stadio Renzo Barbera in front of 10,000 spectators. They made their Serie A debut on 26 August, a 2–0 home loss to Roma, and achieved their first seasonal win in the next matchday, a 4–2 away win at Livorno. The season ticket sale closed on 11 September with 19,992 tickets being altogether sold.

Palermo started their UEFA Cup campaign, their third consecutive, challenging Czech side Mladá Boleslav in the first round. The first leg, played at Mlada's home venue, ended in a 1–0 win for the rosanero thanks to a late winner goal by Boško Janković. This was followed by two Serie A consecutive wins, a 1–0 away victory at Cagliari and a last-minute 2–1 triumph against Milan, with Miccoli scoring a late winning goal during injury time.

However, in the return leg of the UEFA Cup first round, Palermo lost 1–0 at home, with a Mladá goal scored during injury time, and were defeated in the subsequent penalty shootouts, causing an unexpected elimination. In October, Palermo managed just to achieve four ties out of four matches, causing the team to slide down to ninth place, six points behind the fourth UEFA Champions League spot; increasing fans disappointment for these poor results led them to whistle and jeer the players during their October 31 home match, a home match with Parma ended in a 1–1 tie thanks to a late penalty equaliser scored by Amauri. In the aftermath of the match, Palermo captain Andrea Barzagli heavily criticized the fans for what he felt to be a hostile reception. They returned to win on 10 November in a 2–1 home win to Napoli, after five consecutive ties. A crushing 5–0 away loss at Juventus on 25 November however persuaded club chairman Zamparini to sack Colantuono the next day and reappoint Guidolin at the helm of the rosanero. Guidolin marked his debut on 2 December, losing the Sicilian derby 3–1 in Catania. This was followed by two consecutive wins to Fiorentina and Atalanta and a home tie with Lazio, which allowed the rosanero to end the 2007 solar year in sixth place, four points shy of the fourth Champions League spot. Still in December, Palermo made their Coppa Italia seasonal debut with a 0–0 draw against Udinese at Stadio Friuli. They were however later defeated at home, and thus eliminated from the competition, by the bianconeri on the return leg, with a goal by Antonio Floro Flores scored during injury time.

During the January transfer market, Palermo loaned out Franco Brienza, the only player to have been a rosanero in all the top three Italian tiers, to Reggina. They successively sold Marco Pisano (on loan) and Aimo Diana (permanent transfer) to Torino, and signed full back Federico Balzaretti from Fiorentina and youngsters Luca Di Matteo and Edgar Çani from Pescara. The rosanero ended the first Serie A half in eighth place, after two consecutive league defeats to Sampdoria and Siena (the latter at home), and notably with the second-worst defensive line in terms of goals allowed. Palermo ended their negative row of results of four consecutive defeats (including Coppa Italia matches) with a 1–0 home win to Livorno on 2 February. However, a disappointing row in March, with two points in four matches, and Palermo down to eleventh place, causing Zamparini to attack Guidolin for the poor performances of his team. This was followed by a third consecutive defeat, a disappointing 3–2 home loss to Genoa, and subsequent criticism by Guidolin who attacked Palermo fans declaring "it's like playing in hell here". These remarks were immediately criticized by the club management, who consequently declared they might reconsider Guidolin's position as head coach in the near future. On March 24 Palermo announced to have sacked Guidolin and reappointed Colantuono at the helm of the rosanero. In the debut match for his second tenure, Palermo lost 1–0 to Napoli, suffering the match's lone goal during injury time, but managed to defeat 3–2 third-placed Juventus the following week thanks to a late goal by full back Mattia Cassani, and then winning the Sicilian derby the following week thanks to a free kick by Fabrizio Miccoli.

Palermo ended the league in 11th place, their worst result since the rosaneros return to the top-flight in 2004.

Match results

Serie A

UEFA Cup

Coppa Italia

Player details
Final statistics

|-
|colspan="12"|Players sold or loaned out during the January transfer market:

|}

January transfer market bidsInOut'

See also
 2007–08 in Italian football

References

Palermo F.C. seasons
Palermo